Gajendra is a 1984 Indian Kannada-language political thriller film directed by V. Somashekhar based on a screenplay by M. D. Sundar. The film stars Ambareesh playing the title character along with Pavithra, Vajramuni, T. N. Balakrishna and Sudheer in other supporting roles. The film's songs were composed by G. K. Venkatesh, with lyrics written by Chi. Udayashankar. The film was released on 14 February 1984.

Cast 
 Ambarish  as Gajendra
 Pavithra
 Vajramuni
 T. N. Balakrishna
 Shakti Prasad
 Sudheer
 C. H. Lokanath
 M. S. Karanth
 Mukhyamantri Chandru
 Lohithaswa

Soundtrack 

 Rama Krishna Gandhi Buddha - S P Balasubrahmanyam and Chorus
 Amma Ammamma - S P Balasubrahmanyam and Vani Jairam
 Antasthu Yellide? - S P Balasubrahmanyam
 Partner Hello Partner - S P Balasubrahmanyam and M Ramesh
 Ravi Baninda Jarabeku Gilirama - S P Balasubrahmanyam and Vani Jairam

References 

1980s Kannada-language films
Films directed by V. Somashekhar